Xanthonia vagans is a species of leaf beetle. Its range spans from Central Texas to Sonora, Mexico. It is associated with junipers.

References

Further reading

 

Eumolpinae
Articles created by Qbugbot
Beetles described in 1884
Taxa named by John Lawrence LeConte
Beetles of North America